Catasetum purum, the one-colored catasetum, is a species of orchid found in Brazil.

References

External links

purum
Orchids of Brazil
Plants described in 1824